The 1964 Kentucky Derby was the 90th running of the Kentucky Derby. The race took place on May 2, 1964. Northern Dancer's winning time set a new Derby record (later broken).

Full results

Winning Breeder: Windfields Farm (E. P. Taylor); (ON)

References

1964
Kentucky Derby
Derby
Kentucky
Kentucky Derby